Nicola Furlong (born 17 December 1990 Wexford, Ireland; died 24 May 2012 Shinjuku Ward, Tokyo, Japan) was an Irish female exchange student murdered in Japan. An American man, Richard Hinds, was convicted of her murder.

A memorial, located in Ardcavan, Co Wexford, was erected in her memory in 2018.

Murder
Nicola Furlong was found dead on May 24, 2012 in Tokyo at the Keio Hotel in Tokyo's Shinjuku ward. She and another Irish exchange student had attended a concert by Nicki Minaj earlier that evening, and remained in Tokyo after missing their train home. Police arrested two American men, 19-year-old Richard Hinds and 23-year-old dancer James Jamari "JSTYLZ" Blackston, who allegedly invited Furlong and her friend for drinks after meeting them at the Nicki Minaj concert. Hinds was subsequently charged with the murder of Furlong.

During their trial in 2013, Hinds claimed he put his hands around Furlong's neck after she refused his sexual advances, and that he had no intention to kill her. However, his version of events was rejected by the prosecution, who claimed that Hinds tried to rape Furlong while she was unconscious, only for her to wake up and scream. Hinds then strangled her. According to police, Furlong's friend was sexually assaulted in the taxi on the way to the hotel while both women were unconscious. Once they arrived at the men's hotel, the hotel provided a wheelchair to take the incapacitated women to the men's rooms. Police said the groping that took place in the taxi was captured on a security camera, as was the entrance of the two women to the hotel in wheelchairs being pushed by the two men.

Conviction
On 19 March 2013, Hinds was found guilty and sentenced to five to ten years imprisonment for the murder of Nicola Furlong. His release was originally projected for November 2017, but his parole was delayed after authorities deemed that he had "failed to convince authorities that he was remorseful for Nicola's murder." Blackstone was sentenced to and served three years in a Japanese prison for the sexual assault of Furlong's friend.

Release of murderer
Hinds was released from prison on 19 November 2022 and deported to the United States on a commercial flight.

References

External links
 

May 2012 crimes
Irish people murdered abroad
Murdered students
Murder in Japan
2012 in Tokyo
Irish murder victims
2012 murders in Asia
2012 murders in Japan